Reg Davidson (born 1954) is an Aboriginal Canadian carver and a member of the Haida band government.

He was born in 1954 at the Haida village of Masset on the Queen Charlotte Islands of British Columbia.  His parents are Claude and Vivian Davidson and, through Claude, he is the grandson of the Haida artist and memoirist Florence Davidson.  He is a member of the Eagle moiety, Ts'ał'lanas lineage. He began carving argillite in 1972 and became apprenticed to his older brother, the carver Robert Davidson, during the carving of a housefront and houseposts in honour of their grandmother Florence Davidson's father Charles Edenshaw in 1977 and 1978.

Davidson works in argillite and wood and also produces silkscreens.

Sources
 Blackman, Margaret B. (1982; rev. ed., 1992) During My Time: Florence Edenshaw Davidson, a Haida Woman.  Seattle: University of Washington Press.
 Macnair, Peter L., Alan L. Hoover, and Kevin Neary (1984) The Legacy: Tradition and Innovation in Northwest Coast Indian Art.  Vancouver, B.C.: Douglas & McIntyre.
 Stewart, Hilary (1993). Looking at Totem Poles.  Seattle: University of Washington Press. ISBN.
.

External links
Reg Davidson, Haida Artist

1954 births
Living people
20th-century First Nations sculptors
Canadian male sculptors
20th-century Canadian male artists
21st-century First Nations people
Haida woodcarvers
Northwest Coast art